Vaughn Karpan (born June 20, 1961) is a Canadian former ice hockey player. He is currently the director of player personnel for the Vegas Golden Knights.

Karpan played with the Canada men's national ice hockey team from 1983 to 1988. He competed with Team Canada at the 1984 and 1988 Winter Olympics. 

After retiring from his playing career, Karpan was hired by the Winnipeg Jets as an amateur scout in 1993.  He joined the scouting staff of the Arizona Coyotes in 1996 and served as the team's director of amateur scouting from 1999-2005. In 2005, Karpan was hired as a scout by the Montreal Canadiens.  On May 27, 2015, the Canadiens announced that Karpan had been named as their director of professional scouting.

Career statistics

Regular season and playoffs

International

References

External links

1961 births
Living people
Arizona Coyotes scouts
Brandon Wheat Kings players
Canadian ice hockey left wingers
Ice hockey people from Manitoba
Ice hockey players at the 1984 Winter Olympics
Ice hockey players at the 1988 Winter Olympics
Montreal Canadiens scouts
Olympic ice hockey players of Canada
Sportspeople from Flin Flon
Vegas Golden Knights executives
Winnipeg Jets (1972–1996) scouts